Brave 5: Go For Glory (also known as Brave 5) was a mixed martial arts event held live by Brave Combat Federation on Sunday April 22, 2017 at the Sardar Vallabhbhai Patel Indoor Stadium in Mumbai, India. The event was broadcast live online and locally through Bahrain TV, ABS-CBN Sports and Action, Combate, Claro Sports and OSN Sports.

Background

Brave 2: Dynasty was Brave Combat Federation's fifth card, the third to take place outside Bahrain, where the company headquarters is located, and the first one in the Indian Subcontinent.

Mohammad Farhad was supposed to face Aziz Julaidan in a featured bantamweight bout but Julaidan was forced to withdraw due to a last-minute injury. India's Irfan Khan was then called and fought Farhad in the only match between Mumbai-based fighters.

Bahrain's Hamza Kooheji was supposed to fight India's Chaitanya Gavali in a featured bantamweight bout but got himself injured during a training session and was pulled from the card. Hamza was replaced by Jeremy Pacatiw, from the Philippines.

The Muneer-Mangat rivalry 

Labeled by the local media as the biggest rivalry in the history of combat sports in India, the bad blood between Gurdarshan Mangat and Abdul Muneer started with a fan poll conducted by The Fan Garage to pick the best Indian fighter in 2016, won by Muneer.

A fight was then set in India in order to determine who was the country's best fighter. Since they don't compete in the same division, Gurdarshan moved up to featherweight for the bout, set to serve as the co-main event of the evening.

After an extensive war of words prior the match, the rivalry reached its peak during the official weigh-ins, a day before the event when Gurdarshan and Muneer almost started a fight on the stage after an intense staredown.

The main event controversy 

Originally a decision win in favor of Carl Booth, the main event of the evening was surrounded by a big controversy, being eventually overturned into a no contest.

The fight was supposed to be a 5-minute x 5-round bout but ended up being finished between rounds 4 and 5. The All India Mixed Martial Arts Federation (AIMMAF) opened and investigation and decided to overturn the result to a no contest.

Aftermath 
After their fight Gurdarshan and Muneer showed a great amount of respect for each other. Meanwhile, Irfan Khan expressed his desire to have a rematch with Mohammed Farhad. At the same time, Ahmed Faress and Mohammed Farhad noted that they would love to fight Mangat next.

Broadcast

The event was broadcast internationally online, through Brave's official website and YouTube channel, for free. In addition, the card was also broadcast in Bahrain through Bahrain TV, Middle East through OSN Sports, Hispanic America through Claro Sports, Brazil through Combate and Asia through ABS-CBN Sports and Action.

Broadcasting team

Play-by-play commentator: Cyrus Fees
Color Commentator: Rama Reddy
Cage announcer: Carlos Kremer

Results

Bonus Awards
Fight of the Night: Haider Farman x Jomar Pa-ac
Knockout of the Night: Carl Booth
Submission of the Night: Elias Boudegzdame

References

Mixed martial arts events